Rimo Hunt (born 5 November 1985) is an Estonian former professional footballer. He played as a  striker for Estonian clubs Tallinna Kalev, Levadia, Nõmme Kalju and Kazakh club Kaysar Kyzylorda.

Hunt made his international debut for the Estonia national team on 3 June 2013 in a friendly against Belarus. He made a total of 7 appearances for Estonia before retiring.

Club career

Tallinna Kalev
Hunt scored 35 goals in 30 matches in the 2011 season, helping Tallinna Kalev win the Esiliiga and earn promotion to the Meistriliiga. He was named Esiliiga Player of the Year.

Levadia
On 9 February 2012, Hunt signed for Meistriliiga club Levadia. He scored 11 goals in 35 games as Levadia finished the 2012 season as runners-up. He won the Meistriliiga title in the 2013 season, and was Levadia's top goalscorer in the league with 22 goals.

Kaysar Kyzylorda
On 7 February 2014, Hunt signed a one-year contract with Kazakhstan Premier League club Kaysar Kyzylorda.

Return to Levadia
On 28 January 2016, Hunt returned to Levadia and was named team captain ahead of the 2016 season. He was the team's top scorer in the 2017 season with 20 goals.

Nõmme Kalju
On 15 February 2018, Hunt signed a one-year contract with Meistriliiga club Nõmme Kalju, with the option to extend the contract for another year.

International career
On 28 May 2013, Hunt was called up to the Estonia squad for friendly matches against Belarus, Trinidad and Tobago and Kyrgyzstan. He made his international debut on 4 June 2013, replacing Kristen Viikmäe in his testimonial match, a 0–2 home loss against Belarus. He scored his first international goal for Estonia on 5 March 2014, in a 2–0 away win over Gibraltar in a friendly.

International goals
Estonia score listed first, score column indicates score after each Hunt goal.

Honours

Club
Tallinna Kalev
Esiliiga: 2011

Levadia
Meistriliiga: 2013
Estonian Cup: 2011–12
Estonian Supercup: 2013

Individual
Meistriliiga Player of the Year: 2013
Esiliiga Player of the Year: 2011

References

External links

1985 births
Living people
Sportspeople from Haapsalu
Estonian footballers
Association football forwards
Esiliiga players
JK Tallinna Kalev players
Meistriliiga players
FCI Levadia Tallinn players
Nõmme Kalju FC players
Kazakhstan Premier League players
FC Kaisar players
Estonia international footballers
Estonian expatriate footballers
Estonian expatriate sportspeople in Kazakhstan
Expatriate footballers in Kazakhstan